The 2022 Associate international cricket season was from approximately May to September 2022. All official twenty over matches between Associate members of the ICC were eligible to have full Twenty20 International (T20I) or Women's Twenty20 International (WT20I) status, as the International Cricket Council (ICC) granted T20I status to matches between all of its members from 1 July 2018 (women's teams) and 1 January 2019 (men's teams). The season included all T20I/WT20I cricket series mostly involving ICC Associate members, that were played in addition to series covered in International cricket in 2022. In July 2022, Cambodia, the Ivory Coast and Uzbekistan were all awarded Associate Membership of the ICC.

Season overview

April

2022 Spain Tri-Nation Series

May

2022 France Women's Quadrangular Series

Finland in Denmark

2022 Valletta Cup

Uganda women in Nepal

Jersey in Guernsey

2022 Women's Nordic Cup

June

Hungary in Austria

2022 Kwibuka Women's T20 Tournament

2022 Germany Tri-Nation Series

Malta in Belgium

Switzerland in Luxembourg

2022 ACC Women's T20 Championship

Estonia in Finland

Serbia in Bulgaria

Guernsey women in Jersey

Namibia women in the Netherlands

2022 ICC T20 World Cup Europe Qualifier C

Malaysia in Singapore

2022 Namibia T20 Tri-Nation Series

July

2022 Malaysia Quadrangular Series

Papua New Guinea in Singapore

Namibia women in Germany

2022 Central Europe Cup

Malaysia women in Singapore

Bulgaria in Serbia

2022 ICC T20 World Cup Global Qualifier B

2022 ICC T20 World Cup Europe Qualifier A

2022 ICC T20 World Cup Europe Qualifier B

Mozambique in Eswatini

Mozambique women in Eswatini

August

Bahrain against Kuwait in Oman

2022 Baltic Cup
Matches played at the Baltic Cup did not have T20I status as only Estonia were members of the ICC.

Italy women in Austria

2022 Asia Cup Qualifier

Nepal in Kenya

Malta women in Romania

September

2022 Women's T20I Balkan Cup

See also
 International cricket in 2022

Notes

References

2022 in cricket